The International World Wide Web Conference Committee (abbreviated as IW3C2 also written as IW3C2) is a professional non-profit organization registered in Switzerland (Article 60ff of the Swiss Civil Code) that promotes World Wide Web research and development. The IW3C2 organizes and hosts the annual World Wide Web Conference in conjunction with the W3C.

The IW3C2 was founded by Joseph Hardin and Robert Cailliau at a meeting held in Boston, United States, on 14 August 1994 to prepare for the upcoming Second International World Wide Web Conference in Chicago. The IW3C2 formally became an incorporated entity in May 1996 at the fifth conference in Paris, France.

The organization is governed by laws of the Swiss Confederation and the By-laws.

Abbreviation
The abbreviation for the International World Wide Web Conference Committee as IW3C2 is as follow:

I- The I is represents the leading I in International.
W3- The W3 represents the three 3 leading W's in World Wide Web.
C2- The C2 represents the three 2 leading C's in Conference Committee.

Mission
The mission of the IW3C2 is:
 To coordinate the organization and planning of the international WWW conference series and ensure that it remains the foremost conference addressing World Wide Web research and development;
 To promote a collaborative spirit among conference attendees that is essential to the success of the series;
 To ensure the global geographical diversity of conference sites and provide support to local organizers at those sites;
 To make sure that all content arising from these conferences and forums is permanently and openly available on the widest possible scale;
 To preserve the history of the conference series;
 To encourage the global development of the World Wide Web through collaboration with WWW standards organizations;
 To provide a permanent, broad-based international body to achieve these purposes.

Conferences

The conferences are organized by the IW3C2 in collaboration with local organizing committees and technical program committees. The series provides an open forum in which all opinions can be presented, subject to a strict process of peer review. The proceedings of the conference are published in the ACM Digital Library.

Endorsed conferences
The IW3C2 has endorsed regional conferences devoted to a special topic of the Web by working with endorsed conferences on cross-promotion, publicity and programs.

Membership
Members of the IW3C2 are ordinary members, ex officio members, non-voting members, and officers.

Ordinary members
Ordinary members are elected for a period of 3 years during a general meeting. Members are nominated due to their recognition in the WWW community and represent themselves. Members can be re-elected only after at least one year of absence.

The following are the founding members at the time when IW3C2 was officially incorporated in May 1996:
 Jean-François Abramatic
 Tim Berners-Lee
 Robert Cailliau
 Dale Dougherty
 Ira Goldstein
 Joseph Hardin
 Tim Krauskopf
 Detlef Krömker
 Corinne Moore
 R. P. Channing Rodgers
 Albert Vezza
 Stuart Weibel
 Yuri Rubinsky (died prior to incorporation)

The following are the current (April 2016) ordinary members:
 Robin Chen
 Chin-Wan Chung
 Allan Ellis
 Wendy Hall - IW3C2 Chair
 Ivan Herman
 Arun Iyengar - IW3C2 Vice Chair
 Irwin King
 Yoelle Maarek
 Luc Mariaux - IW3C2 Treasurer
 Daniel Schwabe - IW3C2 Vice-Chair

Ex officio members
Ex officio members are selected from the immediate past conference general co-chairs and from future conference co-chairs. Their term expires one year after the conference they organized. Ex officio members can be elected as ordinary members.

The following are current (April 2016) ex officio members and the conference with which they are affiliated:
 Jacqueline Bourdeau - WWW2016
 James Hendler - WWW2016
 Rick Barrett - WWW2017
 Rick Cummings - WWW2017
 Laurent Flory - WWW2018
 Fabien Gandon - WWW2018

Officers
The IW3C2 officers consist of a chairperson, a vice-chair (chairperson-elect), a secretary, a treasurer, and other appointees. Officers are elected during a general meeting (usually at the annual WWW conference) and serve for one year. They can be re-elected an indefinite number of times.

The Seoul Test of Time Award
This annual award, presented at the WWW conference, is made possible by a generous contribution from the organizers of WWW2014 (Seoul Korea). Recipients are determined by the IW3C2 and honor the author, or authors, of a paper presented at a previous WWW conference that has "stood the test of time." The first award, announced at WWW2015 (Florence Italy), recognized Sergey Brin and Larry Page, the founders of Google. The recipients of the WWW2016 award are LinkIn scientist Dr. Badrul Sarwar and University of Minnesota professors George Karypis, Joseph Konstan, and John Riedl (posthumous) for their work in item-item collaborative filtering.

See also
 History of the World Wide Web
 World Wide Web Conference

References

External links
 IW3C2 website
 IW3C2 Blog

Computer networking conferences
Professional associations based in Switzerland
Organizations established in 1994
World Wide Web
Web development
International organisations based in Switzerland
World Wide Web Consortium